Stade Olympique Maritime Boulonnais, commonly known as SOMB, is a French professional basketball club based in Boulogne-sur-Mer, France. The team currently plays in the French third division, the Nationale Masculine 1.

History
SOMB was founded on 5 September 1935. In the first years, basketball remained dormant in the club; the first games were played in the 1939–40 season. After a stop of activities during World War II, the team became an official FFBB team in 1945. In 1953 the club started its bigger development: youth teams were added and the first team played in the national Second Division.

In the 2013–14 season, SOMB won the Pro B, and promoted to the Pro A for the first time. They were relegated back to Pro B after the season.

Honours
 Pro B
Champions (1): 2013–14

Season by season

Players

Current roster

Notable players

References

External links
Official website

Boulogne-sur-Mer
Boulogne-sur-Mer
Basketball teams established in 1935